Ahu Yağtu is a Turkish actress and model known for her appearance on the television drama Ninety-Sixty-Ninety (2001) as well as the character "Candan" in the series Paramparça. she won the "Style Icon of the Year" award at Elle Style Awards 2013.

Yağtu made her screen debut in 2001 in 90-60-90 as Esin, and later starred in Savcının Karısı in 2005. In 2010,  she appeared in the television series Aşk ve Ceza.

TV series
 Kardeşlerim (2021) Suzan
 Hilal, Feza and Other Planets (2019)
 Kadın (2019) Pırıl
 Paramparça  (2014–2017) Candan Soyl
 Bir Çocuk Sevdim (2011) Begum
 Bir Avuç Deniz (2011) Aylin
 Aşk ve Ceza (2010) Pelin
 Komiser Nevzat (2007) Zeynep
 29-30 (2006) Nil
 Savcının Karısı (2005) Ece
 Kampüsistan (2003)  
 90-60-90 (2001)  Esin

References

External links
  Ahu Yağtu, Nurgül Yeşilçay'ın Paramparça'dan ayrılmasına ne dedi at hurriyet.com.tr
  Ahu Yağtu gecelerde dağıttı! at aktuel.com.tr
  Ahu Yağtu kucak kucağa yolculuk yaptı! at milliyet.com.tr
  Ahu Yağtu kimdir? Ahu Yağtu kucak kucağa yolculuk yaptı! at sabah.com.tr

Living people
Turkish television actresses
21st-century Turkish actresses
Actresses from Istanbul
Year of birth missing (living people)